Ni Ni's Treehouse is a preschool television series and was produced jointly by The Itsy Bitsy Entertainment Company and GMTV. It was originally aired on TLC and GMTV from 2000 until 2003.

About the show
Ni Ni works in a treehouse on an Oooberry tree in an Oooberry forest in Oooberryland.

Characters
 Ni Ni - A yellow dog with an active imagination.
 Treezles - Two green squirrels whose names are Bee with a red nose and Dee with a pink nose.
 Norman and the Fingerlings - Norman is a yellow character with colored shapes and multicolored hair and the Fingerlings - Fip, Fap and Feppy are small red characters with fingers for arms. Fip is the only girl and the eldest one, Fap has yellow glasses and is the middle one, and Feppy is the youngest one.
 Oupagogo - A green creature with yellow spots and blue hair with a simple vocabulary who lives in a yellow house.
 Horace the Hippo - A pink hippo who lives in a cottage in a jungle with his friends like Ant, Henry the Elephant, Marmoset and Owl.
 The Drawing Children - Some human children who are great at drawing pictures which are turned into a story told by a child.
 The Stringy Things - A blue string named Big String and a yellow string named Little String who can turn into anything they want.

Cast
 Lewis Rae - Ni Ni - costume
 Jennifer Thompson Taylor - Nini - voice
 Gillie Robic - Treezle Bee - voice
 Debby Cumming - Treezle Dee - voice
 Mark Todd - Norman - voice
 Susanna Howard - Fip the Fingerling - voice
 Kevin Griffiths - Fap the Fingerling - voice
 Steve Tiplady - Feppy the Fingerling - voice
 Megg Nicol - Oupagogo - voice

Segments
 Norman and the Fingerlings
 Oupagogo
 Horace the Hippo
 The Drawing Children
 The Stringy Things

Animations
 Horace & Oupagogo & Stringy Things - Ealing Animation (El Nombre)
 Children's Stories (The Drawing Children) - Flicks Films (Mr. Men, Junglies and Bananaman)

Episodes

Season 1 (2000)
 Silly Shapes (9/25/2000)
 Spring Clean (9/26/2000)
 Sleepy Heads! (9/27/2000)
 Sing-a-long (9/28/2000)
 Save It! (9/29/2000)
 Forget-Me-Not (10/2/2000)
 Sorry! (10/9/2000)
 Let's Pretend (10/16/2000)
 Feeling Fine! (10/23/2000)
 How Many? (10/30/2000)

Season 2 (2001)
 Guess What (1/1/2001)
 Cover Up! (1/8/2001)
 A Perfect Fit (1/15/2001)
 Keep Fit (1/22/2001)
 Faster Faster (1/29/2001)
 Let's Play (2/5/2001)
 Drink Up (2/12/2001)
 Special Things (2/19/2001)
 Smile (2/26/2001)
 It's Mine! (3/5/2001)
 Big Friends (3/12/2001)
 What's Wrong? (3/19/2001)
 Look Here (3/26/2001)
 Rise and Shine (4/2/2001)
 Wrap Up (4/9/2001)
 Wakey Wakey (4/16/2001)
 Surprise Surprise (4/23/2001)
 Giddyup (4/30/2001)
 Boo! (5/7/2001)
 Over Here! (5/14/2001)

Season 3 (2002)
 Peek-a-Boo! (5/6/2002)
 Clean It Up! (5/13/2002)
 Found It! (5/20/2002)
 Pretty Pictures! (5/27/2002)
 Moo! Moo! (6/3/2002)
 Yummy! (6/10/2002)
 Up and Away! (6/17/2002)
 I've Won (6/24/2002)
 Stay Cool! (7/1/2002)
 I'm the Best (7/8/2002)
 Bump! (7/15/2002)
 Pretty Please (7/22/2002)
 Tasty (7/29/2002)
 Coochi Coo! (8/5/2002)
 Brrr! (8/12/2002)
 Roar! (8/19/2002)
 Oh Dear! (8/26/2002)
 Be Brave! (9/2/2002)
 Bright Ideas (9/9/2002)
 Snap (9/16/2002)

Season 4 (2003)
 Tap! Tap! Tap! (1/6/2003)
 Please Wait! (1/7/2003)
 Aaachoo (1/8/2003)
 Here We Go (1/9/2003)
 Let's Explore (1/10/2003)
 Big Surprise (1/13/2003)
 One! Two! Three! (1/20/2003)
 Crash Bang (1/27/2003)
 Me Me Me (2/3/2003)
 It's Freezing (2/10/2003)
 Birdie Birdie (2/17/2003)
 Grow! (2/18/2003)
 Who's Who (2/19/2003)
 Super Duper (2/20/2003)
 Wing-a-Long (2/21/2003)

Broadcast
The show was first aired on TLC. It was also aired on Discovery Kids (as part of Ready Set Learn) and Spanish-speaking Telemundo in the United States. Internationally, it was aired on GMTV Kids and later CITV Channel in the UK in 2006.

Direct-to-video
 The Oooberry Alphabet Zoo!
As it is raining in Oooberryland and they cannot go to the zoo, Nini and the Treezle Twins learn their alphabet while drawing the animals for their own personal Oooberry zoo.
 Keep On Counting!
After having a look at some of his castle drawings, Nini makes a castle for Princesses Bee and Dee as they learn their numbers from 1 to 10.
 Nursery Rhyme Time!
Nini sketches most of the 14 nursery rhymes covered, allocating a special book for each.
 Nini's Coloring Circus!
The Treezles are upset because they've missed the bus to the circus, but Nini saves the day by drawing them their own personal circus involving many colors and shapes.  
 Nini's Birthday Surprise!
It's party time in Oooberryland! Bee and Dee, the Treezle Twins, are celebrating their birthday and Norman and the Fingerlings are having trouble with Fap's surprise gift.

External links
 

2000 American television series debuts
2003 American television series endings
2000s American children's television series
2000 British television series debuts
2003 British television series endings
2000s British children's television series
2000s preschool education television series
American preschool education television series
American television series with live action and animation
American television shows featuring puppetry
British preschool education television series
British television series with live action and animation
British television shows featuring puppetry
English-language television shows
Television shows about dogs
Television series about squirrels
TLC (TV network) original programming